The Adirondack Lumberjacks were an independent professional baseball team based in Glens Falls, New York. The team moved to Bangor, Maine and became the Bangor Lumberjacks following the 2002 season.  The team won the inaugural 1995 Northeast League Championship and the 2000 Northern League Championship.

Results

Regular season

Postseason

History

1995
The Lumberjacks along with the Albany-Colonie Diamond Dogs, Mohawk Valley Land Sharks, Newburgh Night Hawks, Sullivan Mountain Lions, and the Yonkers Hoot Owls form the Northeast League. In their first season they posted a record of 42 victories and 27 defeats under manager Dave LaPoint and earned a playoff berth via the wild card. In the one game wild card playoff the Jacks defeated the Mohawk Valley Land Sharks 8-3 to move onto the Championship Series against their Northway Rivals, the Albany-Colonie Diamond Dogs.

The Lumberjacks first beat the Diamond Dogs, 11-1, and lost at home, 7-5. They won the decisive third match 8-5, to win the inaugural Northeast League Championship. Third baseman Bo Durkac received Most Valuable Player Honors, and was signed to a minor league contract with the new Arizona Diamondbacks franchise in the off season.

See also
Bangor Lumberjacks

References

Baseball teams established in 1995
Baseball teams disestablished in 2002
Northern League (baseball, 1993–2010) teams
Defunct baseball teams in New York (state)
Defunct independent baseball league teams
Professional baseball teams in New York (state)